Đorđe Jovanović (21 January 1861, Novi Sad – 26 March 1953, Belgrade) was a Serbian sculptor and a full member of the Serbian Academy of Sciences and Arts.

Biography
Jovanović was born in Novi Sad, where he spent the first three years of his life. Then, his family moved to Požarevac. He studied at Kragujevac, where he obtained his baccalauréat from Grandes écoles in 1882.

In 1884, he obtained a state grant to pursue his post-graduate studies at the Academy of Fine Arts in Vienna, where he started studying painting and sculpture. He also studied at the Academy of Fine Arts in Munich.

After completing his studies in 1887, he lived between Munich, Paris, and Belgrade. In Paris, he improved his art with Henri Chapu and Jean Antoine Injalbert.  In 1889, at the World Exhibition in Paris, he won a prize for the "Gusle" and then, in 1900, at the World Exhibition in Paris, he won the first award for the "Kosovo Monument".

Jovanović was very prolific, and many of his works can be seen in Serbia, and in particular in Belgrade. Sculptor and Cartoonist Jovan Pešić (1866-1936) was one of his early students in Novi Sad.

He exhibited his artworks as a part of Kingdom of Serbia's pavilion at International Exhibition of Art of 1911.

Jovanović married Emma Victoria Scheitler on 26 September 1889. They had two sons: Mirko (1892–1915) and Branko (1895–1939). After Emma Victoria died in 1928 near Munich, Jovanović married Marguerite Robert (1879–1965).

Today his work can be found in parks, art galleries, and museums throughout Serbia. Also, Đorđe Jovanović work can be found in the collection of Milan Jovanović Stojimirović who bequeathed a large number of sculptures, paintings, sketches, and artifacts to the Art Department of the Museum in Smederevo.

Gallery

See also
Đorđe Jovanović House
List of painters and sculptors from Serbia

References

SANU bio

1861 births
1953 deaths
Artists from Novi Sad
19th-century sculptors
20th-century Serbian sculptors
Male sculptors
Serbian people of Greek descent
Burials at Belgrade New Cemetery